Shotley Gate is a settlement in the civil parish of Shotley, in the Babergh district, in the county of Suffolk, England. It is located at the tip of Shotley Peninsula and is the larges settlement in the parish of Shotley, in 2020 it had an estimated population of 1461. Shotley Gate has a pub called the Bristol Arms (formerly the Shotley Gate Inn) the settlement of Shotley Gate developed either side of Bristol Hill.

By about 800 AD, the Vikings or Danes started to make an appearance in this area. Under the Peace of Wedmore in 878, all land north of the old Roman Watling Street, which ran from London to Chester, was given to the Viking leader, Guthrum. Shotley therefore became part of Danelaw. The peace was short-lived however, and following an unsuccessful Viking attack on Kent, Alfred King of Wessex attacked the enemy in East Anglia.
The Anglo-Saxon Chronicle for the year 885 reads as follows:
The same year sent King Alfred a fleet from Kent into East Anglia. As soon as they came to Stourmouth, there met them sixteen ships of the pirates, and they fought with them, took all the ships and slew the men. As they returned homeward with their booty, they met a large fleet of pirates and fought with them the same day, but the Danes had the victory.
It is possible that Bloody Point at Shotley took its name from this incident, however at that time the river entered the sea north of Felixstowe and so the area would not have been seen as the mouth of the Stour.
It could also have derived this name late in the next century when the Vikings returned to the estuary in force, twice plundering Ipswich. Shotley Gate and the parish have a strategic position for protecting the ports of Felixstowe, Harwich and Ipswich and in 1865 the Shotley Battery fortifications were established.

King Edward III camped here early in the Hundred Years War, before the great sea Battle of Sluys. Documents signed by him and kept in the National Archive end with the words "at Shotley".

Shotley Gate also harbours HMS Ganges, a former Royal Navy training establishment (RNTE Shotley) for boys. The teak ship was constructed in 1821 and taken out of service in 1861. It was moved to Shotley in 1899, and by 1905 was moved ashore. A large proportion of the naval ratings of the 20th century, boy entrants in peacetime and men during both World Wars, trained there.
The training establishment closed in 1976 and the site was subsequently sold for redevelopment. In June 2011 Babergh District Council declared the site a Conservation Area.

The HMS Ganges Museum (open Saturdays, Sundays and Bank Holidays between Easter and the end of October 1100 to 1700hrs) houses artefacts and memorabilia from the old shore establishment including a large collection of photographs and original documents.

References 

Villages in Suffolk
Shotley